Chavín District is one of eleven districts of the province Chincha in Peru.

References